is a Japanese manga series written and illustrated by Tarō Nogizaka. It has been serialized in Shogakukan's seinen manga magazine Big Comic Superior since June 2019.

Plot 
Arata Natsume, who works at a child protection center, receives a request from Takuto Yamashita, the orphan of a victim of a bloody serial murder, to meet his father's killer on his behalf. Takuto had been exchanging letters with Shinju Shinagawa, the murderess, under the name of Arata in order to discover the location of his father's head, which remains unfound.

Arata decides to help Takuto and gets a prison visit with the assassin. When the eccentric and weird Shinju infers that Arata was not the real author of the letters she decides to get up and leave. Arata, desperate for the meeting not to end, decides to shout at her impulsively that he wants to marry her. This arouses Shinju's interest, who accepts the proposal and orders her lawyer, Miyamae, who believes in her innocence, to follow the proceedings. 

Arata pretends to be in love and wants to go through with the marriage proposal, particularly when Shinju seems to have changed her attitude and appears willing to collaborate with justice, revealing the location of another victim's arm, which had also not been found. Miyamae asks Arata to continue collaborating with the case so that Shinju's memory will return and she will be exonerated of guilt, suspecting that Shinju is not the murderer. Arata reluctantly decides to continue to make her believe that his marriage intentions are honest despite believing that Shinju is really the murderer and possibly wants to kill him as well.

Publication
Natsume Arata no Kekkon is written and illustrated by Tarō Nogizaka. The series began in Shogakukan's seinen manga magazine Big Comic Superior on June 28, 2019. Shogakukan has collected its chapters into individual tankōbon volumes. The first volume was released on November 29, 2019. A promotional video for the fourth volume, featuring Yūki Ono as Arata Natsume and Akari Kitō as Shinju Shinagawa, was posted on November 30, 2020. As of June 30, 2022, eight volumes have been released.

The manga is licensed in France by Glénat.

Volume list

Reception
Natsume Arata no Kekkon received the Next Manga Awards' U-NEXT prize in 2020. The series was recommended by Blue Period author Tsubasa Yamaguchi.

See also
Iryū — another manga series created by Tarō Nogizaka

References

Further reading

External links
 

Marriage in anime and manga
Psychological thriller anime and manga
Seinen manga
Shogakukan manga